Kondajji is a village in Harihar taluk, in the Davangere district, Karnataka.

Kondajji is well known as a picnic spot and it is one of the major scout and guide training center in South India. A lake runs through the centre of the village and the village is surrounded by minor hills.
there is a Scouts guides Bhavan and you cannot is there a hero stone 

Power generation using wind energy has also been implemented by the state government.

References 

Villages in Davanagere district